Samurai Girl is a six-hour mini-series loosely based on the popular young-adult novel series by Carrie Asai. The event stars Jamie Chung, Brendan Fehr, and Stacy Keibler. The series began its three-day premiere on ABC Family on September 5, 2008.

Premise
This story follows Heaven, who at six months old was the sole survivor of a deadly plane crash. The press named her Heaven, because it seemed that she fell from the sky. Soon after, she was adopted by the powerful Kogo Family and lived a very privileged life. But 19 years later, things take an unexpected turn, when her wedding is attacked and her brother, Ohiko, is killed trying to save her, not before warning her that the Yakuza have infiltrated her family. She breaks free from her family and begins training to be a samurai and fight back against the Yakuza.

Plot

Part 1

Heaven sneaks maple glazed donuts into the compound and is startled by Hiko. Hiko tells Heaven that he is leaving to go to stay with his friend Jake in San Francisco and gives Heaven a necklace as a birthday present.

One year later, we find that Heaven's about to be wed to Teddy Yukimura. But as the wedding takes place, Yakuza ninjas attack her wedding. Her brother is killed trying to protect her, and her father is shot. Later, she goes to a party where she sees the hostess dumping her boyfriend. The next morning, the hostess Cheryl finds Heaven hiding in her closet. With Cheryl's friend Otto's help, Heaven finds Jake and find that Hiko left her a bag containing a fake passport to a Zen monastery in Indonesia. But, against Hiko's wishes, she returns to the Kogo Towers Hotel. As she is trying to access her fathers files, she is discovered by the maid and takes off running with the laptop and is rescued by Jake.

Later on, Heaven calls Otto to help access the laptop without a password and is able to access surveillance videos to find that her limo driver, Noriyuki, is being beaten up. As they are trying to find the source, the files are deleted but not before discovering that it came from a nightclub. Heaven and Jake head to the nightclub to rescue Noriyuki but are ambushed. After the ambush, they find Noriyuki as he was about to perform Seppuku. When they return to Jake’s loft, Heaven gives Noriyuki a package containing money to escape. Then he tells Heaven about a legend that involves her.

Part 2
Heaven begins training with Jake. Soon after, she discovers that Jake was a former Yakuza ninja and asks Jake to find the ninja that killed Hiko. When Heaven goes to the supermarket, she encounters a man named Severin, who tells her that he was building a case against her father and the Yakuza and asks her to return home. While at Cheryl's house to check her e-mail, two Yakuza ninjas attack. Cheryl, Otto and Heaven flee to Jake's loft. During a battle with the master assassin, Heaven discovers that her father organized the attack at the wedding. Severin again meets up with Heaven to tell that her necklace was also a tracking device and that he needs her help to take down her father's empire. After which Heaven agrees to return home.

Part 3
As Heaven is set to return home, Severin warns her that her father is a dangerous man. But she is still convinced that her father is innocent. Then Severin tells her that her father had murdered Teddy's father, Yuji Yukimura. She returns home and discovers that she is a part of an ancient prophecy. With the help of Severin, Cheryl, and Otto, Heaven sneaks into her father's office and steals the documents about the prophecy. After a meeting with Heaven's father, Teddy tells Heaven about the prophecy while he is preparing to leave.

Part 4
On the way back from Hiko's funeral, Sato tells Tasuke that her daughter was a spy and were heading to an unknown location when Jake rescues her and takes her back to the hotel to retrieve the sword. To avoid being seen by her father, Heaven and Jake share a long fake kiss. When they finally get back to Jake's loft, they find that Karen, who is Jake's ex-fiancée, has returned to the house. Heaven feels furiously jealous that Jake has a fiancée after they just shared their "first kiss." After Severin reviews the text, he hands it to a former professor to have it translated: He tells her that a secret decoder written on a series of bones sits at the Japanese consulate. So Heaven, Severin, and Cheryl head over to retrieve the bones. 
            
After retrieving the bones, they discover that a piece of the prophecy is within the Sierra Nevada mountains. So Heaven and Severin set out to get that piece. Jake joins them but they discover that Sato and his men have started on the trail, so they climb up the face of Mount Kyra. While Dr. Fleming (who Cheryl has a crush on) examines the artifacts, Karen sneaks into his office and kills him. Meanwhile, two of the carabiners break free, pulling Jake and Severin down. Severin tells Heaven to cut one of them loose or lose both of them.

Part 5
Part 5 opens with Severin and Jake yelling at Heaven to cut either of their ropes. Heaven reluctantly cuts Jake's rope sending him falling backward down the mountain. Heaven stays frozen until Severin orders her to climbing so that Jake wouldn't have died in vain. However, Heaven and Severin are not successful in gaining the mirror and return home with nothing. Soon after, Jake, who survived the fall, returns with the mirror and a captured Sato. Otto and Cheryl tell Heaven of Karen's true identity, and Heaven becomes suspicious of her (without evidence) and refuses to confront Jake. After a botched sting operation to uncover Tasuke's money launderer, known only as Sonia, Karen stabs Sato and cuts herself to make it look like he escaped.

Part 6
After stabbing Jake, Karen beats up Heaven and kidnaps Cheryl. After seeing Jake at the hospital, she leaves for a location outside Kyoto, Japan. Meanwhile, Severin is interrogating Tasuke, who was arrested in a planned sting, during which he tells the history of the Morishi Protocol which included an underground bidding war. Heaven ends up killing Jake's ex and survives the Morishi Protocol even though her destiny was to die in the end for a person to survive. Heaven, Cheryl, and Severin return to the loft to find that Jake left. Five months later, we find Heaven working as a waitress. Otto brings Heaven a letter from Jake. At the end, on the way home, Heaven comes across Sato and is quickly surrounded by a gang of ninjas and she prepares to fight them.

Promotion
On the second day of the 2008 San Diego Comic-con, the cast and crew promoted the movie by signing autographs and participated in a question and answer session with attendees.

Cast
 Jamie Chung as Heaven Kogo
 Brendan Fehr as Jake Stanton
 Saige Thompson as Cheryl
 Kyle Labine as Otto
 Anthony Wong as Tasuke Kogo
 Kenneth Choi as Sato
 Steven Brand as Severin
 Stacy Keibler as Karen
 Linda Ko as Mieko Kogo
 Zen Shane Lim as Teddy
 Sab Shimono as Noriyuki
 Jack Yang as Hiko Kogo
 Jennifer Chung as Security Tech
 Yulin Hswen as Servant
 Paul Wu as Master Ninja
 Toshi Haraguchi as Yukimura
 Kwesi Ameyaw as Surgeon
 Warren Christie as Dr. Thomas Fleming
 Jeffrey Parazzo as Bartender
 Byron Lawson as Tough
 Jasmine Chan as Young girl
 Apollonia Vanova as Seaya
 Jim K. Chan as Visa Clerk
 Nicole Fraissinet as Joanne
 Shannon Chan-Kent as Attendant
 Kendall Cross as Female Paramedic
 John Hainsworth as Painting Man
 Jason Diablo as Male Paramedic
 Darryl Quon as Sumo
 Peter Kawasaki as Priest
 Silver Kim as Shady Man
 William MacDonald as Detective
 Adam Thomas as Greek God
 Stephanie Penikett as Vampire
 Daniel Boileau as Bartender
 Hector Johnson as Bulky Guard
 Tom Tames as Drunk Hipster

References

External links
 
 Former Samurai Girl Official Site

2000s American television miniseries
American martial arts films
Martial arts television series
Television shows based on American novels
ABC Family original films
Television series by Alloy Entertainment
Television series by ABC Studios
2008 martial arts films
2008 films
Japan in non-Japanese culture
Asian-American television
Works about the Yakuza
2000s American films